Will & Grace is an American television sitcom that aired for eight seasons on NBC from 1998 to 2006, and resumed on September 28, 2017.
The show earned sixteen Emmy Awards, and 83 nominations. Will & Grace is set in New York City and focuses on Will Truman, a gay lawyer, and his best friend Grace Adler, a straight Jewish woman who runs her own interior design firm. Also featured are their friends Karen Walker, a rich socialite; Jack McFarland, a struggling gay actor/singer/dancer who also has had brief careers as a choreographer, cater-waiter, nurse and talk show host; and Rosario Salazar, Karen's maid with whom she has a love-hate relationship.

Despite initial criticism for its particular portrayal of gay people, Will & Grace is the most successful series portraying gay principal characters, as it went on to become a staple of NBC's Must See TV Thursday night lineup where it was ensconced in the Nielsen for half of its network run. Every episode of the series was directed by James Burrows, one of the show's executive producers. In January 2017, NBC announced that the series would return for a 12-episode season during the 2017–18 season. All four principal cast members (Debra Messing, Eric McCormack, Sean Hayes, and Megan Mullally) confirmed their return to the revival. An additional four episodes were ordered on August 3, 2017, for a total of 16, and a tenth and eleventh season were also ordered.

Series overview

Episodes

Season 1 (1998–99)

Season 2 (1999–2000)

Season 3 (2000–01)

Season 4 (2001–02)

Season 5 (2002–03)

Season 6 (2003–04)

Season 7 (2004–05)

Season 8 (2005–06)

Season 9 (2017–18)

Season 10 (2018–19)

Season 11 (2019–20)

Webisode

Special

Ratings

Notes

References

External links
 

Will and Grace episodes, List of